Philip or Phillip Brown may refer to:

 Philip Brown (actor) (born 1958), American actor
 Philip Brown (alpine skier) (born 1991), Canadian alpine ski racer
 Philip Brown (Charlottetown politician) (born 1958–59), Canadian politician
 Philip Brown (Prince Edward Island politician) (born 1957), Conservative Canadian politician
 Phillip Brown (sociologist) (born 1957), British sociologist of education, economy and social change
 Philip E. Brown (1856–1915), jurist in the state of Minnesota
 Philip F. Brown (1842–1921), American politician in the Virginia House of Delegates
 Philip Marshall Brown (1875–1966), American educator and diplomat
 Philip Martin Brown (born 1956), English actor
 Philip R Brown (born 1963), Australian educator and educational leader
 Philip Brown (1838–1913), Canadian merchant, immigration officer and religious figure in Manitoba who constructed Shaarey Zedek Synagogue in Winnipeg

See also
 Phil Brown (disambiguation)